is a former Japanese football player.

Playing career
Yoshiki Yamamoto joined to Kataller Toyama in 2013. In 2014, he moved to Verspah Oita. In 2015, he returned to Kataller Toyama.

References

External links

1994 births
Living people
Association football people from Osaka Prefecture
Japanese footballers
J2 League players
J3 League players
Japan Football League players
Kataller Toyama players
Verspah Oita players
Association football forwards